Russia is a village in Loramie Township, Shelby County, Ohio, United States. The population was 640 at the 2010 census.

History
Russia was founded by Lewis Phillips, who purchased and plotted the land where the village now sits.  Phillips' house, built in 1853, was the first house in Russia; other settlers followed by the late 1850s.  Phillips was also the first businessman in the village, opening a grocery store in 1853.  Later settlers soon founded a dry goods store and multiple sawmills; Russia's economy was once heavily dependent on its sawmills.  Among the earliest settlers were French-speaking Swiss who had served under Napoléon Bonaparte during the war with Russia. According to tradition, the village's name commemorates a battle these veterans had fought in Russia.

Russia was established in an area that was already predominantly French.  In the early part of the nineteenth century, a large number of emigrants from Alsace, Lorraine, and other parts of France settled in southwestern Shelby County and the adjacent portions of northeastern Darke County.  Besides Russia, these immigrants founded the communities of Frenchtown and Versailles.  By the middle of the 1850s, the heavily Roman Catholic population had grown to the point that multiple parishes were established in the area.  A log church was built and dedicated to Saint Remigius, the patron saint of France, and Mass was first celebrated there on June 15, 1854.  The congregation soon outgrew its building and constructed a new brick church; when it became too small, a larger brick church was constructed and completed in 1892.  The village is one of many small communities in a heavily Catholic region of western Ohio known as the "Land of the Cross-Tipped Churches".

Geography
Russia is located at  (40.234696, −84.410416).

Demographics

The median income for a household in the village was $56,035.

2010 census
As of the census of 2010, there were 640 people, 224 households, and 173 families residing in the village. The racial makeup of the village was 99.2% White and 0.8% from two or more races. Hispanic or Latino of any race were 0.2% of the population.

There were 224 households, of which 44.2% had children under the age of 18 living with them, 65.6% were married couples living together, 7.6% had a female householder with no husband present, 4.0% had a male householder with no wife present, and 22.8% were non-families. 21.9% of all households were made up of individuals, and 12.1% had someone living alone who was 65 years of age or older. The average household size was 2.86 and the average family size was 3.34.

The median age in the village was 31.6 years. 35% of residents were under the age of 18; 8% were between the ages of 18 and 24; 24% were from 25 to 44; 19.8% were from 45 to 64; and 13.1% were 65 years of age or older. The gender makeup of the village was 48.4% male and 51.6% female.

Education
Russia has a public library, a branch of Shelby County Libraries. The town is home to one school, Russia Local School, which enrolls grades K-12. The school's athletic programs' mascot is the Raider.

Village Flag

According to the village website, "Russia is a proud village built upon Christian principles, hard work, and a close-knit, community-minded population. Symbols and colors were selected to underscore the town's French and Catholic heritage in addition to how agriculture and industry largely contributed to the development of the community over time."

References

External links
 Russia Local Schools
 Census Viewer

French-American culture in Ohio
Villages in Shelby County, Ohio
Villages in Ohio
Populated places established in 1853
1853 establishments in Ohio